Ha Pak Tin, formerly called Pak Tin, is one of the 25 constituencies in the Sham Shui Po District of Hong Kong which was created in 2007.

The constituency loosely covers Pak Tin Estate in Shek Kip Mei with the estimated population of 16,014.

Councillors represented

Pak Tin (1982–1985)

Pak Tin (1985–1994)

Pak Tin (1994–2007)

Ha Pak Tin (2007–present)

Election results

2010s

2000s

1990s

1980s

References

Constituencies of Hong Kong
Constituencies of Sham Shui Po District Council
2007 establishments in Hong Kong
Constituencies established in 2007
Shek Kip Mei